Probe Records is a small independent record shop in Liverpool, England.

Founded in 1971 by Geoff Davies, the shop was originally located on Clarence Street, off Brownlow Hill with a second location soon opened in the basement of Silly Billies clothes shop. The shop relocated in 1976 to Button Street around the corner from Eric's Club on Mathew Street and found itself at the centre of the city's emerging punk and new wave music scene, acting as a supporter of local independent bands and musicians. Davies admitted that he was far more a music enthusiast than he was a businessman.

In order to supplement the takings in the shop itself, Davies also set up an independent wholesale arm of the business, through which he would promote up and coming talent. Many larger record retailers throughout the north-west of England such as HMV, Virgin Records and Our Price bought most of their independent label stock from Probe. The business became successful enough to eventually set up its own record label. Initially called simply Probe Records, it was re-branded Probe Plus in order to avoid confusion between the retail shop and the record label. The decision of which bands and musicians to sign up to the label was a collaboration between Geoff Davies and two friends, Bolton-born writer Andrew Kenyon-Smith and DJ John Peel.

Local musician Pete Wylie, record producer Julian Cope, Dead or Alive front man Pete Burns, and Frankie Goes to Hollywood vocalist/dancer Paul Rutherford all spent a number of years working in the record shop between 1977 and 1984. Among Probe Plus' signings is indie rock band Half Man Half Biscuit, who have remained with the label for the duration of their careers.

By the 1990s, the shop had again relocated, this time to Slater Street off Bold Street around the corner from The Zanzibar on Seel Street, where it stayed until 2010 before moving to Bluecoat Chambers on School Lane in the centre of the city.

Famous alumni
 Pete Burns – singer
 Julian Cope – producer/performer
 Paul Rutherford – dancer/singer
 Pete Wylie – musician

See also
The Armadillo Tea Rooms (1980s), Liverpool

References

External links
 
 Contemporary photograph of the shop, at Flickr.com

Scouse culture of the early 1980s
Liverpool
Music retailers of the United Kingdom